Paul Ripard (19 August 1931 – April 2009) was a Maltese sailor. He competed in the Star event at the 1960 Summer Olympics.

References

External links
 

1931 births
2009 deaths
Maltese male sailors (sport)
Olympic sailors of Malta
Sailors at the 1960 Summer Olympics – Star
Place of birth missing